Trabuco Hills High School is a high school in Mission Viejo, California, United States.  It is in the Saddleback Valley Unified School District.

Awards
THHS has received:
2002 National Blue Ribbon School of Excellence.

Demographics
The demographic breakdown of the 2,912 students enrolled in 2015-2016 was:
Male - 53.2%
Female - 46.8%
Native American/Alaskan - 0.2%
Asian/Pacific islanders - 11.2%
Black - 1.8%
Hispanic - 24.7%
White - 56.0%
Multiracial - 6.1%

14.0% of the students were eligible for free or reduced-cost lunch.

Extracurricular programs

Instrumental music

During their 2010 and 2013 season, the drumline placed 1st in the Percussion Scholastic A Class at the Southern California Percussion Alliance (SCPA) Championships.

Athletics

Cross Country

Boys
The boys' cross country program competes in the South Coast league. In 2006 and 2011 they finished 1st in the Division 1 California State Championship.

Girls
The girls' cross country program competes in the South Coast league. They placed 2nd at Cif Finals and 3rd at State in 2013.

Notable alumni
Patrick Barnes (1993) - NFL quarterback
Jake Breeland (2016) - NFL player
Jonathon Blum (2007) - National Hockey League player, 2018 Winter Olympian 
Randy Josselyn (1992) - actor
Josh Fuentes (2011) - Major League baseball player, Colorado Rockies
Jarah Mariano (2002) - supermodel
Nick Punto (1996) - Former Major League Baseball player
Andrew Romine (2004) - Major League Baseball player
Josh Todd (1989) - lead singer of bands including Buckcherry

References

External links
 Official school site

Educational institutions established in 1985
High schools in Orange County, California
International Baccalaureate schools in California
Public high schools in California
Mission Viejo, California
1985 establishments in California